Francis Joseph "Bud" Magrum (July 2, 1949 – November 3, 1991) was a Canadian football player who played for the BC Lions. He played college football at the University of Colorado Boulder.

Magrum dropped out of high school after sophomore year to join the United States Marine Corps and fought in the Vietnam War. He was awarded the Purple Heart twice and served as a demolitions expert.  After returning from Vietnam, Magrum played for the Quantico Marines football team as a defensive lineman. Following the advice of his coach to earn a college degree, Magrum turned down offers from NFL teams and instead went to Colorado.

References

1949 births
1991 deaths
BC Lions players
Colorado Buffaloes football players
United States Marine Corps personnel of the Vietnam War
Quantico Marines Devil Dogs football players
American football linebackers